Archers Fork is a stream located entirely within Washington County, Ohio. It is a tributary of the Little Muskingum River, which it enters near the community of Dart.

Archers Fork was named for one Mr. Archer, an early settler.

See also
List of rivers of Ohio

References

Rivers of Washington County, Ohio
Rivers of Ohio